Oliver Kylington (born 19 May 1997) is a Swedish professional ice hockey defenceman for the  Calgary Flames of the National Hockey League (NHL). Kylington was born in Stockholm and grew up in Sundbyberg in the Stockholm urban area. He was drafted 60th overall by the Flames in the 2015 NHL Entry Draft.

Early life
Kylington was born in Stockholm to a Swedish father and an Eritrean mother. His mother, Teber Zeru, settled in Sweden when she was a teenager as a refugee from the Eritrean War of Independence. She and Kylington's father Börje met in Stockholm.

Playing career
Kylington made his Swedish Hockey League (SHL) debut as a 16-year-old playing with Färjestad BK during the 2013–14 season. On 10 January 2014, having impressed at SHL level, Kylington was signed to a two-year contract extension to remain with Färjestad BK. His KHL rights were attained by Avangard Omsk who drafted him 107th overall in the 2014 KHL Junior Draft.

In the midst of his second SHL season in 2014–15, Kylington was loaned by Färjestads to HockeyAllsvenskan team, AIK on 10 November 2014. He produced four goals and seven points, the most in the Allsvenskan by an under-18 player, in 17 games with AIK before returning to Färjestad to finish the season ranked in the top-ten European skaters to be eligible for the 2015 NHL Entry Draft. On 13 May 2015, with the intention of more playing time to further his development, it was announced Kylington had agreed to a two-year contract to return to AIK of the Allsvenskan.

Kylington was drafted in the second round, 60th overall, (a pick acquired via the Arizona Coyotes) by the Calgary Flames in the 2015 NHL Entry Draft. On 15 July 2015, he signed a three-year, entry-level contract with the team. On the direction of the Flames organization, Kylington decided against continuing with AIK and remained in North America to be assigned to their American Hockey League (AHL) affiliate, the Stockton Heat, to begin the 2015–16 season. On 9 April 2016, Kylington made his NHL debut in a game against the Minnesota Wild.

Kylington began the 2018–19 season in the American Hockey League with the Stockton Heat. He was recalled to the NHL and recorded his first career NHL goal in a 5–2 win over the Nashville Predators.

During the 2021–22 season, Kylington posted career-highs in goals, assists, and points with the Flames. He recorded three points in twelve games during the 2022 Stanley Cup playoffs before the Flames were eliminated by the Edmonton Oilers in the Second Round.

Shortly before the start of the 2022–23 season, Flames general manager Brad Treliving stated that Kylington would miss the start of training camp. In November 2022, Treliving stated that Kylington had returned to Sweden to attend to an undisclosed personal matter. By February 2023, Kylington did not return to the Flames and stayed in Sweden.

Career statistics

Regular season and playoffs

International

References

External links

 

1997 births
Living people
AIK IF players
Calgary Flames draft picks
Calgary Flames players
Swedish expatriate ice hockey players in Canada
Swedish expatriate ice hockey players in the United States
Färjestad BK players
People from Sundbyberg Municipality
Ice hockey people from Stockholm
Stockton Heat players
Swedish ice hockey defencemen
Swedish people of Eritrean descent
Swedish sportspeople of African descent
Black ice hockey players